The Landfill Tax (Scotland) Act 2014 is an Act of the Scottish Parliament, introduced to the legislature in 2013 and receiving Royal Assent on 21 January 2014, which creates a new Scottish Landfill Tax. The tax applies mainly to waste management companies and local authorities disposing of waste at landfill.

History
As part of further devolution of powers to the Scottish Government, the Scotland Act 2012 allowed the Government to introduce and raise a Landfill Tax. The Landfill Tax (Scotland) Bill was introduced to the Scottish Parliament on 17 April 2013 by John Swinney MSP. It was discussed by and subsequently passed by Parliament in late 2013 and became law on 21 January 2014, having received Royal Assent. Sections 34, 35, 40, 41, 42 and 44 of the Act came into force on the day of Royal Assent, with the remainder coming into force through later orders of the Scottish Ministers.

Taxation
Scottish Landfill Tax became payable from 1 April 2015 on qualifying deposits of waste at landfill. The Act specified that the tax payable for disposal of waste at landfill would be set by multiplying the standard rate by the weight of the deposit, with the rate to be specified by the Scottish Ministers in a later order. The initial rate of tax was set at £82.60 for the standard rate and £2.60 for the lower rate. As of 1 April 2016, these increased, with the standard rate of Scottish Landfill Tax set at £84.40 per tonne, and a lower rate of £2.68 per tonne applying to "qualifying materials", which includes deposits such as waste soils and minerals. Tax revenues are collected by Revenue Scotland.

See also
 Scottish Landfill Tax
 United Kingdom Landfill Tax
 Taxation in Scotland
 Taxation in the United Kingdom

References

External links
 Legislation.gov.uk - view the Act in full on Legislation.gov.uk
 Revenue Scotland - information on the Scottish Landfill Tax from Revenue Scotland

Taxation in Scotland
Acts of the Scottish Parliament 2014
Waste management
Landfills in the United Kingdom
Waste legislation in the United Kingdom